The eighth season of the CBS police procedural drama series Hawaii Five-0 premiered on September 29, 2017 for the 2017–18 television season. CBS renewed the series for a 23 episode eighth season on March 23, 2017. On November 6, 2017 CBS ordered an additional episode for the season and did the same again on February 8, 2018 bringing the count to 25 episodes. The season concluded on May 18, 2018. The eighth season ranked No. 18 for the 2017–18 television season and had an average of 11 million viewers. The series was also renewed for a ninth season.

Due to pay disputes, this was the first season not to feature Daniel Dae Kim and Grace Park. This was also the first full season not to feature Masi Oka following his departure in the thirteenth episode of the seventh season. Meaghan Rath and Beulah Koale joined as new main cast members. In addition, longtime recurring cast members Dennis Chun, Kimee Balmilero, and Taylor Wily were promoted to series regulars, while another longtime recurring cast member Ian Anthony Dale joined as a series regular and appeared in episodes seven through twenty.

Cast and characters

Main cast
 Alex O'Loughlin as Lieutenant Commander Steven "Steve" McGarrett, United States Navy Reserve
 Scott Caan as Detective Sergeant Daniel "Danny" "Danno" Williams
 Meaghan Rath as Officer Tani Rey
 Jorge Garcia as Special Consultant Jerry Ortega
 Taylor Wily as Kamekona Tupuola
 Dennis Chun as Sergeant Duke Lukela, Honolulu Police Department
 Kimee Balmilero as Dr. Noelani Cunha, Medical Examiner
 Chi McBride as Captain Lou Grover
 Beulah Koale as Police Candidate, later Officer assigned to Five-0 Task Force, Junior Reigns 
 Ian Anthony Dale as Adam Noshimuri, head of Five-0 Special Division of Organized Crime

Recurring cast

 Zach Sulzbach as Charlie Williams
 Shawn Mokuahi Garnett as Flippa Tupuola
 Claire Forlani as Alicia Brown
 Andrew Lawrence as Eric Russo
 Kunal Sharma as Koa Rey
 Kekoa Kekumano as Nahele Huikala
 Christine Ko as Jessie Nomura

Guest stars

 Joey Lawrence as Aaron Wright, brother of world-class hacker Ian Wright
 Chris Vance as Harry Langford, former MI6 agent
 Paige Hurd as Samantha Grover
 Randy Couture as Jason Duclair
 Bob McCracken as DEA Agent Chris Reid
 Casper Van Dien as Roger Niles
 Steven Brand as John Walcott
 Derek Mio as Derek Okada
 Leonardo Nam as Harley Taylor
 Reggie Lee as Joey Kang
 Erika Brown as adult Grace Williams
 Joey Defore as 20 year-old Charlie Williams
 Chosen Jacobs as Will Grover
 Devon Sawa as Brad Woodward
 Shawn Anthony Thomsen as Pua Kai
 Michael Imperioli as Odell Martin
 Claire van der Boom as Rachel Hollander
 Frankie Faison as Leroy Davis
 Ryan Bittle as John McGarrett
 Susan Park as Noriko Noshimuri
 Michelle Borth as Catherine Rollins
 Terry O'Quinn as Joe White
 Willie Garson as Gerard Hirsch
 Robyn Lively as Helen Meech

Episodes

Production
On March 23, 2017, CBS renewed the series for an eighth season, which premiered on September 29, 2017. Filming for the season began on July 8, 2017 with a traditional Hawaiian blessing. Series star Alex O'Loughlin made both his writer and directorial debut during the season. O'Loughlin directed the eighteenth episode of the season and wrote the story for the twenty-fourth episode of the season. The final script for the season was written around early March 2018. Filming on the final episode of the season concluded in the third week of April. The final episode of the season aired on May 18, 2018.

Daniel Dae Kim's and Grace Park's departure controversies
On June 30, 2017, ahead of the series's eighth season, it was announced that series regulars Daniel Dae Kim and Grace Park would be departing the series due to a salary dispute with CBS. Kim and Park had been seeking pay equality with co-stars Alex O'Loughlin and Scott Caan, but did not reach satisfactory deals with CBS Television Studios. CBS's final offer to Kim and Park was 10–15% lower than what O'Loughlin and Caan make in salary. An update of their characters was given in the first episode of the season and in various other episodes throughout the season.

Casting
Following Kim's and Park's departures it was announced that longtime recurring cast member Ian Anthony Dale who portrays Kono Kalakaua's husband Adam Noshimuri had been upped to series regular for the eighth season. It was also announced that Meaghan Rath and Beulah Koale would join the series as new characters and new members of Five-0.

On July 21, 2017, it was announced that recurring cast members Taylor Wily, Kimee Balmilero, and Dennis Chun would also be upped to series regulars for the eighth season.

On September 28, 2017 in an interview with executive producer Peter Lenkov he was asked if Christine Lahti had a chance in returning during the season. Lenkov stated "Yes, well, we haven’t written the episode. There is an episode that we’re talking about, but it all depends on scheduling." However, the story wasn't written and no updates were given. Joey Lawrence starred in two episodes of the season as Aaron Wright's brother of Ian Wright, played by Nick Jonas who appeared in two episodes during season 4. Chris Vance also returned as a guest star and appeared in two episodes as former MI6 agent Harry Langford. It was later announced on March 19, 2018 that previous main cast member Michelle Borth would return as a guest star in the season's twentieth episode. Terry O'Quinn also returned as a guest star in the season's twenty-fourth episode. Teilor Grubbs did not appear at all in the season for the first time since the beginning of the series.

Ian Anthony Dale returned to the series in episode seven and made his final appearance of the season in episode twenty due to conflicting filming of other CBS television show Salvation in which he is also a series regular.

Reception

Ratings

Home video release

References

External links
 
 
 List of Hawaii Five-0 episodes at The Futon Critic
 

2017 American television seasons
2018 American television seasons
Hawaii Five-0 (2010 TV series) seasons